Suryavamsha is a 1999 Indian Kannada-language drama film directed by S. Narayan and written by Vikraman. The film stars Vishnuvardhan in dual role along with Isha Koppikar and Lakshmi. The film's score and soundtrack are composed by V. Manohar. The movie completed silver jubilee run  and collected 15 crore at the box-office. The movie is a remake of 1997 Tamil movie Suryavamsam.

Plot

The story is set in the backdrop of rural India. Satyamurthy is the head of the "Suryavamsha" kinfolk, an aristocratic family in the village of Pandavapura where he is also the distinguished Sarpanch of the local Gram panchayat. Satyamurthy has three sons and a strained relationship with the youngest one, Kanakamurthy, (Vishnuvardhan, in a dual role) since he is illiterate. However, Kanakamurthy has intense respect for his father.

One day, Padma, whose brother is engaged to Kanakamurthy's sister, visits the house. She notices that although Kanakamurthy is son of Satyamurthy, he is treated as a servant in the house. Dodda informs her that in his childhood, Kanakamurthy was a dunce and always earned very poor marks in his school examinations, to face his strict father's wrath. Kanakamurthy actually did not go to school for knowledge, his sole purpose of attending school was meeting his classmate Parimala – the girl adopted by Satyamurthy after the demise of her parents. Once a teacher severely punished Parimala, and Kanakamurthy, in a fit of rage, struck the teacher and bolted away along with Parimala. Kanakamurthy thus became a school dropout and never continued his studies, whereas Parimala proceeded with her studies while maintaining a well-disposed relationship with Kanakamurthy.

Satyamurthy, being aware of the love affair of Kanakamurthy and Parimala, arranged the marriage of the two. However, when Parimala learned of this marriage arrangement, she attempted suicide, only to be rescued by Kanakamurthy. In reality, Parimala's "love" for Kanakamurthy was mendacious. She would never marry Kanakamurthy, whom she considered worthless because of his illiteracy. In order to protect her righteousness in the eyes of Satyamurthy, she made Kanakamurthy declare before Satyamurthy that the decision of their breakup and cancellation of their marriage was Kanakamurthy 's own. A docile Kanakamurthy, for the sake of Parimala 's happiness, did so and added to the displeasure of his father for him. Later, Kanakamurthy, with tearful eyes, watched the marriage of Parimala with a well-off man and he developed antipathy for love because of the distress caused by all these happenings.

Listening to Kanakamurthy's sad past from Dodda, a compassionate Padma acquires fascination for Kanakamurthy and she repeatedly exhibits indications of love for him, which Kanakamurthy does not reciprocate. However, a persistent Padma convinces Kanakamurthy to overcome his past and they fall in love.

Later one day, Kanakamurthy receives a letter from Padma in which she writes that her parents are arranging her marriage with Karigowda's son against her will. Padma resolves either to unite with Kanakamurthy or hang herself to death. Karigowda is an arch-enemy of Satyamurthy and he has a plan of bringing the ruin of the Suryavamsha family by establishing familial relationship with Padma's family, and subsequently by obliging Padma's wealthy lawyer father to act in Karigowda 's favour. Padma 's mother vehemently censures of her daughter's decision of marrying an illiterate man like Kanakamurthy and pleads Satyamurthy to make Kanakamurthy steer clear of Padma. Satyamurthy sends for Kanakamurthy and says to him that if he abandons Padma, he will be received by Satyamurthy as his son. On the other hand, Dodda persuades Kanakamurthy to accept Padma by saying that Padma's love for Kanakamurthy is real and heartfelt; only a few fortunate men receive true love and that ire of Satyamurthy for Kanakamurthy is short-lived which will eventually melt away. Kanakamurthy heeds Dodda's advice and, on the day of Padma's wedding with Karigowda's son, Kanakamurthy gatecrashes into the ceremony and carries Padma away with him and marry in a temple. This act of Kanakamurthy stirs up great anger in Satyamurthy who terminates his relationship with Kanakamurthy and Padma.

Kanakamurthy and Padma start living on the village outskirts. Both form an ideal husband-wife couple and eventually receive the acceptance of Padma's family. Kanakamurthy starts eking out a living by working in a transport company, and later, with the financial assistance of Padma's uncle (Mukhyamantri Chandru) and by dint of his diligence, launches a bus service under the name of his father, which soon flourishes into a booming transport company. Padma teaches Kanakamurthy the three Rs while she pursues her I.A.S. studies. Soon the hardships caused by poverty and the disgrace of Kanakamurthy being illiterate cease and in due course of time, Kanakamurthy becomes a very affluent businessman, richer than his father, and Padma becomes the District collector and soon a son is born to them.

One day, Satyamurthy incidentally comes across Kanakamurthy and Padma's son and is very much gladdened by the child's principles and behavior. Soon he learns that the boy is Kanakamurthy and Padma 's son – a progeny of Suryavamsha. Satyamurthy develops a friendly relationship with his grandson unbeknownst to Kanakamurthy, Padma or any member of his family. Kanakamurthy eventually learns to his surprise and delight that his son has been in communication with his father, Satyamurthy. One day, all of Kanakamurthy's family secretly attend the opening of a charitable hospital for the poor which Kanakamurthy has set up, which was his father's dream. During the speech Kanakamurthy solely praises his father who listens on in shock, that despite all he has done, Kanakamurthy still respects him so much and leaves although his wife sees him.

As a mark of affection for and devotion to his father, Kanakamurthy gives his son some canned kheer to be offered to Satyamurthy upon his next meeting with his son. On the other hand, Kanakamurthy's mother, (Lakshmi) too discovers Satyamurthy secretly meeting his grandson, and she urges Satyamurthy to accept Kanakamurthy back into their family. She says to him that earlier Kanakamurthy a was known by his father Satyamurthy whereas nowadays Satyamurthy is known by his son Kanakamurthy. She reminds that nowadays children drive their parents out of home, whereas Kanakamurthy is the son who has been expelled by his father. These words of Kanakamurthy's mother make Satyamurthy comprehend the virtue of Kanakamurthy. Before Satyamurthy speaks a word to Kanakamurthy, he throws up blood, apparently because of consuming the kheer offered by Kanakamurthy. A critically ill Satyamurthy is hospitalized.

The hospital is swarmed by Satyamurthy well-wishers. When Kanakamurthy arrives at the hospital, Karigowda proclaims before the crowd that it is Kanakamurthy who has attempted to kill his father because of his elimination by Satyamurthy from his family, with the poisoned kheer being an evidence against Kanakamurthy. When Karigowda and his men proceed to kill Kanakamurthy, Satyamurthy arrives for Kanakamurthy's rescue. It is then when Satyamurthy testifies against Karigowda in presence of the crowd how Karigowda, with artifice, poisoned the kheer offered to him by Kanakamurthy. An impassioned Satyamurthy gives up all the hatred for Kanakamurthy, unifies with him and decides to pass his final verdict on this long-standing enmity with Karigowda. Both Satyamurthy and Kanakamurthy fight Karigowda and his men until Karigowda confesses his guilt and begs Satyamurthy for his forgiveness.

Cast
Vishnuvardhan as Sathyamurthy and Kanakamurthy (dual role)
Isha Koppikar as Padma
Lakshmi as Sathyamurthy's wife
Hema Choudhary as Padma's mother
Ramesh Bhat as Padma's father
Vijayalakshmi as Parimala
Doddanna as Dodda Kanakamurthy's uncle
Mukhyamantri Chandru as Padma's uncle (military man)
S. Narayan as Athmananda (special appearance)
M. N. Suresh as Chikka: Kanaka's assistant 
Lakshman Rao as Karigowda: rival of Sathya Murthy 
Tension Nagaraj 
Girish Kamplapura
Vijayakashi 
Sunitha Shetty 
V. Lakshmi
Master U.P. Chandan as son Kanakamurthy

Soundtrack
All music are scored by V. Manohar and lyrics by S. Narayan and Doddarangegowda.

Box Office
The film was a blockbuster and had a theatrical run of more than 200 days at theaters across Karnataka. The movie completed silver jubilee run  and collected 15 crore at the box-office.

References

External links

2000 films
Kannada remakes of Tamil films
2000s Kannada-language films
Films directed by S. Narayan
Indian drama films
2000 drama films